This is a list of crossings of Rock Creek.  Rock Creek runs for 31 miles from its source in Montgomery County, Maryland, to its mouth at the Potomac River, of which the final nine miles lies in Washington, D.C.  The entirety of Rock Creek downstream of the Maryland border is within Rock Creek Park (except for a small portion that runs through the National Zoo).  The crossings built after Rock Creek Park was established in 1890 until World War II tended to be stone-faced bridges constructed to harmonize with the rustic surroundings, while postwar bridges were more utilitarian concrete and steel structures.  Of the 35 crossings, 23 are covered by a Historic American Engineering Record (HAER), and two bridges—the gargantuan Taft Bridge and the bucolic Boulder Bridge—are on the National Register of Historic Places.

The first two crossings of Rock Creek were at the sites of the present M Street Bridge (1788) and K Street Bridge (1792), near the mouth of the creek.  By the early twentieth century, when the initial plans for the Rock Creek and Potomac Parkway were being made, many of the bridges along its intended path in the lower portion of the valley were utilitarian steel-truss bridges at K Street, Pennsylvania Avenue, M Street, P Street, and Calvert Street, and there was a massive earthen embankment carrying Massachusetts Avenue across the valley, with a tunnel underneath for the creek to pass through.  The sole crossing of any architectural value was the monumental 1907 Taft Bridge. Construction of the parkway entailed the replacement of all of these crossings except the Taft Bridge to align with the park's intended aesthetics, and the erecting of many more.

Farther upstream, at the time the upper portion of Rock Creek Park was established in 1890, the area was mainly undeveloped woodland containing small farms and mills accessed by private roads.  Most crossings of the creek were fords rather than bridges, with the exception of bridges at Military Road and Peirce Mill.  Much of the initial development of the park was overseen by Lansing H. Beach, after whom Beach Drive is named.

Nearly all of the remaining portion of Rock Creek in Maryland is part of Rock Creek Stream Valley Park and Rock Creek Regional Park.  This portion of the park was established in 1902.  Rock Creek in Maryland flows through densely developed suburbs and is crossed by several major highways.

District of Columbia

Maryland

See also

References

Articles containing video clips
Rock Creek